Currawilla Station is a pastoral lease that currently operates as a cattle station in Queensland.

The property adjoins Palparara and Narradunna Stations. It is situated in the Channel Country and is well watered by numerous creeks in the area. The homestead is found along the Currawilla waterhole on the Torrens Creek. Farrar's Creek also runs through the property.

Established at some time prior to 1878, by Jack Farrar on Karuwali tribal lands. Farrar had worked at McGregor's Mount Margaret Station and kept his own herd. Farrar later sold it to Mr Cotton who substantially increased the size of the holding.

In 1881 it was sold by Messrs Cotton and Malpas to Messrs Martin and Johnston. In 1887 the heaviest flooding known at the time following exceptionally heavy rains in the area, Currawilla recorded  over a two-day period. In 1887 the property was managed by William Henry Watson. The owners of the station in 1889 were Messrs Edward Martin and Company of Melbourne. Drought struck in 1897 but it was less severe at Currawilla compared to many surrounding properties. Eventually in 1889, Watson, who was still managing the property, bought it outright.

In 1914 Currawilla was sold by Watson to the Bergin brothers. The  property was stocked with approximately 6,000 head of cattle and 150 horses.

See also
List of ranches and stations

References

Stations (Australian agriculture)
Pastoral leases in Queensland
Central West Queensland